Dontrell is a given name. Notable people with the given name include:

Dontrell "Cockroach" Hamilton, fictional Marvel Comics supervillain
Dontrell Hilliard (b. 1995), American football player
DonTrell Moore (b. 1982), American football player

See also
Dantrell
Dontrelle

Masculine given names